Emmanuel Lebesson (born 24 April 1988) is a French table tennis player. He competed at the 2016 Summer Olympics in the men's singles event, in which he was eliminated by Adrian Crișan, and as part of the French team in the men's team event. In October 2016 he won the men's singles title at the European Table Tennis Championships, defeating compatriot Simon Gauzy in the final.

References

1988 births
Living people
People from Niort
French male table tennis players
Olympic table tennis players of France
Table tennis players at the 2016 Summer Olympics
Universiade medalists in table tennis
Sportspeople from Deux-Sèvres
Mediterranean Games gold medalists for France
Mediterranean Games medalists in table tennis
Competitors at the 2009 Mediterranean Games
Universiade silver medalists for France
European Games medalists in table tennis
Table tennis players at the 2015 European Games
European Games silver medalists for France
Table tennis players at the 2019 European Games
Medalists at the 2009 Summer Universiade
Medalists at the 2011 Summer Universiade
Table tennis players at the 2020 Summer Olympics